Augusto Goemine Thomson, who adopted the pseudonym Augusto d’Halmar (April 23, 1882 – January 27, 1950) was a Chilean writer who earned the National Prize for Literature in 1942.

D’Halmar was the son of Auguste Goemine, a French navigator, and Manuela Thomson. He was born in Santiago de Chile, although he himself claimed to have been born in Valparaiso. He became widely known in Chile by his adopted nom de plume, Augusto d’Halmar, in honour of his maternal great grandfather the Swede Baron de d’Halmar. His paternal great grandfather was the Scotsman Alexander Cross. Augusto was left an orphan at the age of 10 and he was reared by his stepsisters. He was a pupil in the Miguel Amunátegui Liceum from 1896 until he was interned in a Seminary which he abandoned in 1896 in order to devote himself entirely to literature. Good insights to Augusto's early life and family history can be read in "La Colonia Tolstoiana" by Fernando Santivan.

Literary works 
Juana Lucero, novela (1902); en 1934 se publicó con el nombre de La Lucero.
Vía crucis, (1906)
Al caer la tarde, teatro, (1907)
La lámpara en el molino, novela (1914).
Los Alucinados, novela (1917).
La Gatita, novela corta, (1917).
La sombra del humo en el espejo, novela, (1918).
Nirvana, poesía (1918)
Mi otro yo, poesía (1920).
Cuatro evangélicos en uno, edición de lujo (1922).
Vía Crucis, edición ilustrada (1923).
Pasión y muerte del cura Deusto (1924)
La Mancha de Don Quijote (1934)
Capitanes sin barco, tres novelas, novela (1934).
Catita y otras narraciones, cuentos (1935).
Amor, cara y cruz, novela y cuentos (1935).
Lo que no se ha dicho sobre la actual revolución española, poesía (1936).
Rubén Darío y los americanos en París (1941) ensayo.
Palabras para canciones, poesía (1942).
Mar, novela poemática, (1945).
Carlos V en Yuste y Castilla (1945).
Cristián y yo, cuentos (1946).
Los 21, ensayo (1948)
Cursos de oratoria, (1949).
Recuerdos olvidados, poesía (1975).

References

1882 births
1950 deaths
Chilean male novelists
Chilean male poets
Chilean people of French descent
Chilean people of Scottish descent
Chilean people of Swedish descent
Gay poets
Gay novelists
Chilean LGBT poets
Chilean LGBT novelists
Chilean gay writers
Modernismo
People from Valparaíso
National Prize for Literature (Chile) winners
20th-century Chilean poets
20th-century Chilean male writers
20th-century Chilean novelists